The 12th World Sports Acrobatics Championships were held in Wrocław, Poland, in 1995.

Men's tumbling

Overall

Somersault

Twist

Men's group

Overall

Balance

Tempo

Men's pair

Overall

Balance

Tempo

Mixed pair

Overall

Balance

Tempo

Women's group

Overall

Balance

Tempo

Women's pair

Overall

Balance

Tempo

Women's tumbling

Overall

Somersault

Twist

References

Acrobatic Gymnastics Championships
Acrobatic Gymnastics World Championships
International gymnastics competitions hosted by Poland
1995 in Polish sport